Jim Nelson is an artist whose work has appeared in role-playing games.

Career
His Dungeons & Dragons work includes Races of Stone (2004), Races of Destiny (2004), Sandstorm (2005), Lords of Madness (2005), Stormwrack (2005), Player's Handbook II (2006), Monster Manual IV (2006), Complete Mage (2006), and the 4th edition Monster Manual (2008).

He is known for his work on the Magic: The Gathering collectible card game. His art also appears in the digital collectible card game Hearthstone.

References

External links
 Jim Nelson's website

Living people
Place of birth missing (living people)
Role-playing game artists
Year of birth missing (living people)